Sailing was contested at the 2006 Asian Games from December 5 to December 13. Competition took place in various sailing disciplines at the Doha Sailing Club.

Schedule

Medalists

Men

Women

Open

Medal table

Participating nations
A total of 168 athletes from 19 nations competed in sailing at the 2006 Asian Games:

References

External links
Official website

 
2006
2006 Asian Games events
2006 in sailing
Sailing competitions in Qatar